Pauline Volkstein (19 January 1849 – 6 May 1925) was a German composer of over 1,000 songs.

Volkstein was born in Quedlinburg. She had little formal music training, but came from a musical family. Her mother had studied counterpoint with Friedrich Schneider, and her uncle was cellist and composer Bernhard Cossmann. Volkstein lived in Paris, Dresden, Murano, and Naples before settling in Weimar with her sister in 1905. Her first songs were published around that time.

Volkstein set her own poems to music and also composed music for texts by poets Arndt, Bierbaum, Chamisso, Eichendorff, Falke, Fallersleben,  Flaischlen, Fleming, Geibel, Gersdorff, Goethe, Greif, Halm, Groth, Heine, Keller, Kerner, Lenau, Liliencron, Lons, Morike, Muller, Opitz, Roquette, Saar, Schenkendorf, Storm, Uhland, and Wolff. She composed some pieces with piano or guitar accompaniment, but wrote many stand-alone melodies that were later arranged with accompaniments by other composers, such as Armin Knab and Justus Hermann Wetzel.

Volkstein self-published some of her music. Several of her songs with guitar accompaniment initially appeared in Der Wächter, a magazine associated with the German youth movement during the 1920s and 1930s. Her music was also published by Fritz Schuberth and Ries & Erler GMBH.

Volkstein's compositions include:

12 Folksongs (see External Links)
12 Lieder
12 Lieder (piano setting by Justus Hermann Wetzel)
20 Songs with Guitar Accompaniment
24 Folksongs with Simple Accompaniment
Bloom, Dear Violet (arranged by Armin Knab)
Jungfrau Zimperlich (text by Ludwig Pfau)
Melodies (piano setting by Justus Hermann Wetzel)
New Folksongs (1922)
Piano compositions
Spinning Song (arranged by Armin Knab)

References

External links 
Sheet Music for 12 Folksongs by Pauline Volkstein with piano setting by Justus Hermann Wetzel

German women composers
1849 births
1925 deaths
20th-century German composers
People from Quedlinburg
Place of death missing
20th-century women composers
20th-century German women